Robin Taillan (born 27 May 1992) is a French professional footballer who plays as a right-back for Championnat National 2 club Sète.

Career
Taillan briefly joined Olympique de Marseille in 2014, and played for their reserve side. He rejoined Béziers and helped them get promoted to the Ligue 2 in 2018. He made his professional debut with Béziers in a 2–0 Ligue 2 win over Nancy on 27 July 2018.

In June 2020, Taillan joined Quevilly-Rouen after Béziers were relegated to the Championnat National 2.

Personal life
Outside of football, Taillan is also trained as an electrician.

Career statistics

References

External links
 
 

1992 births
Living people
Sportspeople from Béziers
Footballers from Occitania (administrative region)
Association football fullbacks
French footballers
RCO Agde players
AS Béziers (2007) players
Olympique de Marseille players
ES Paulhan-Pézenas players
US Quevilly-Rouen Métropole players
CS Sedan Ardennes players
FC Sète 34 players
Championnat National 2 players
Championnat National 3 players
Championnat National players
Ligue 2 players